The PBA Commissioner's Cup is a tournament of the Philippine Basketball Association. Along with the PBA Governors' Cup, the tournament (also named as "conference") is one of the two competitions in a PBA season that allows teams to hire a single foreign player, also known as an "import". The tournament was first held in 1993 as the PBA season's second competition.

The tournament was discontinued when the Invitational Championship was reintroduced in 2003. From 2004 to 2010, the league decreased their tournaments per season from three to two competitions; one All-Filipino tournament, named as the Philippine Cup and one with imports, named as the Fiesta Conference The tournament was re-instated in 2011 as the second competition of the PBA season after the league re-adopted the three conference format.

The Commissioner's Cup also refers to the trophy awarded to the champion team.

History
During the 1993 PBA season, the league moved the All-Filipino Conference as the first tournament of the season and made the Second Conference as the Commissioner's Cup, a reference to the PBA Commissioner. The conference was the second tournament held in a PBA season.

The Swift/Sunkist franchise won the tournament in 1993 and 1995. Purefoods, with Kenny Redfield as import and Chot Reyes as head coach, defeated Alaska in 1994.

During Alaska's grandslam season of 1996, they won the Commissioners Cup title over Shell in a grueling seven-game series. The Gordon's Gin Boars ended their six-year drought, winning over the Milkmen in 1997, giving playing coach Robert Jaworski his last PBA title on both capacities. A year later, Alaska had Devin Davis as import to win the title over San Miguel.

From 1999 to 2000, San Miguel won the Commissioners Cup with Terquin Mott and Stephen Howard as imports. But in 2001, the Beermen was upset by the Red Bull Thunder, with Best Import Antonio Lang in six games.

In 2002, with most of the team's star players are with the national squad, the PBA once again allowed team's to take two imports with a 12-feet maximum height limit. Red Bull won the series over Talk 'N Text in seven games.

The tournament was retired in 2003 after the re-introduction of the Invitational Championship as the second conference of the season but was eventually reactivated in 2011 after the league restored the three-conference season format.

Tournament format
From 1993 to 1997, the teams were divided into two groups in the group stage. The teams in the same group will play against each other once and against teams in the other group twice. After the eliminations, the top five teams will advance to a double-round robin semifinals. A playoff incentive will be given to a team that will win five of their eight semifinal games should they fail to get the top two finals berths. The top two teams (or the No. 1 team and the winner of the playoff between team with at least 5 semifinal wins and the No. 2 team) will face each other in a best-of-seven championship series. In 1995, a slightly modified post eliminations format was adopted. Instead, the top six teams will advance to the quarterfinal round for another single round robin. The top four team will then be seeded in a best-of-five series with the winners advancing to the finals.

In 1998, the league adopted a quarterfinal-semifinal playoff format with the top two seeds advancing automatically to the semifinals and the next four teams will be matched up in the quarterfinals. The winners will advance to the semifinal round and to compete against the two top seeded teams in a best-of-five series. The winners of the semifinal round will then advance to the best-of-seven championship series. This format was slightly modified due to the entry of the Tanduay Rhum Masters in 1999. The top eight teams after a round-robin regular round will advance to the quarterfinals. The top two seeds will have a twice-to-beat advantage against the last two seeded teams. Other seeded teams will compete in a best-of-three playoffs. The winners will compete in a best-of-five semifinals series. Then the winners of the semifinals will advance to a best-of-seven finals series.

After the reintroduction of the tournament in 2011, the league adopted a tournament format similar on what was used in 1998. The top two teams will gain automatic semifinals seed while the next four teams will compete in a best-of-three quarterfinals.

From the 2013 edition of the tournament, the playoff format was revised and adopted the similar playoff format used for the Philippine Cup, in which the first two teams will gain a twice to beat advantage against the last two seeded teams and the other teams will compete for a best of three playoffs.

The height limit for import players varies from every year. In the tournament's reintroduction in 2011, the height limit was 6'4" (1.93 m). In 2012, the league removed the height restrictions. The handicapping system was reinstated in 2014, where the height limit of 6'9" (2.06 m) was imposed for the playoff teams of the previous Philippine Cup. In 2017, the limit is 6'10" (2.08 m) for all teams.

Trophy design

The trophy design used since the 1994 season features the Commissioner's Cup with the league logo at the front. The cup is placed in a base where the name of and the year of the tournament is engraved. Red, blue and yellow ribbons were placed in the handles of the trophy, mirroring the colors in the PBA logo. The winner keeps permanent possession of the trophy and a new one is created every year.  In 2012, the trophy's cup handles were modified and the league logo was replaced with the tournament's season logo.

List of champions

Per season

Per franchise

* Defunct franchise

Individual awards

Best Player of the Conference

Bobby Parks Best Import award

External links
 PBA.ph

 
Commissioner's Cup
Recurring sporting events established in 1993